The Fremantle History Society is a historical society focused on Fremantle, Western Australia.

The Fremantle History Society was established in 1994, growing out of a community of heritage enthusiasts that had developed around The Fremantle Society (which was established in 1973). The two societies have worked towards establishing heritage protection in Fremantle, during different stages of threats to buildings and streetscape.

It has published the Fremantle Studies journal since 1999, as well as a newsletter, and every year hosts the Fremantle Studies Day conference at which the authors of papers in the journal present their work.

Notes

External links 
 

1994 establishments in Australia
Historical societies of Australia
History of Fremantle